Bilavar may refer to:
 Bilavər, Kermanshah
 Bilavar Rural District, Iran